Kagbere is the chiefdom seat town in the Magbaiamba Ndowahun Chiefdom, in the Bombali District, Northern Province of Sierra Leone.

Populated places in Sierra Leone
Northern Province, Sierra Leone